Albert Cooper Jr. (February 23, 1904 – December 1993) was a former U.S. soccer goalkeeper who later served in the New Jersey General Assembly. Cooper earned two cap with the U.S. national team in 1928. The first came at the 1928 Summer Olympics when the U.S. lost to Argentina 11–2. Following this loss, the U.S. tied Poland, 3-3, on June 10, 1928.  At the time of the Olympics, he played for Trenton F.C.

Born and raised in Trenton, New Jersey, and attended Trenton Central High School, from which he graduated in 1921. After his Olympic play, he competed for the Trenton Highlanders of the American Soccer League and played minor league baseball. He also played basketball, including for the Trenton Tigers and the Trenton Bengals of the American Basketball League. An attorney, he was elected to serve as Sheriff of Mercer County, New Jersey and represented Trenton as a Democrat in the New Jersey General Assembly.

References

1904 births
1993 deaths
Footballers at the 1928 Summer Olympics
Democratic Party members of the New Jersey General Assembly
New Jersey lawyers
Olympic soccer players of the United States
People from Southampton Township, New Jersey
Soccer players from Trenton, New Jersey
Sportspeople from Burlington County, New Jersey
Trenton Central High School alumni
Trenton Highlanders players
United States men's international soccer players
Association football goalkeepers